Coolera/Strandhill is a Gaelic Athletic Association club based in the Coolera Peninsula, comprising the parish of Strandhill and Ransboro in County Sligo, Republic of Ireland.

The club often contests Sligo Senior Football Championship finals.

Notable players
Peter Laffey

Honours
 Sligo Senior Football Championship (2): 1907, 2005
 Sligo Senior Hurling Championship (1): 2018
 Sligo Intermediate Football Championship (2): 1989, 1995
 Sligo Junior Football Championship (4): 1916, 1949, 1971, 2007
 Sligo Under 20 Football Championship (2): 2002, 2009
 Sligo Minor Football Championship (3): 1932, 1939, 1964
 Sligo Senior Football League (Division 1) (5): 1939, 1942, 1946, 1953, 2022
 Sligo Senior Football League (Division 2) (3): 2005, 2007, 2012
 Sligo Intermediate Football League Division 3 (ex Div. 2) (2): 1989, 1995
 Sligo Junior Football League (Division 5) (2): 1971, 1990
 Kiernan Cup (3): 1992, 2005, 2013

References

External links
 Coolera/Strandhill website

Gaelic games clubs in County Sligo